Liquidity Services (NASDAQ:LQDT) operates a network of e-commerce marketplaces.

Its online auction marketplaces include: Liquidation.com, GovDeals.com, Network International, GoIndustry DoveBid, IronDirect, Machinio, and Secondipity.com.

The company is based in Bethesda, MD. It has  warehouses and offices throughout the world.

Liquidity Services’ annual revenue totaled $270 million for the fiscal year ending in September 2017. It is listed on the NASDAQ stock exchange under the symbol LQDT and completed its initial public offering (IPO) in 2006.

History  
  
Liquidity Services was co-founded by William P. Angrick III, Jaime Mateus-Tique, and Ben Brown in 1999. It was branded as Liquidation.com and was a B2B auction marketplace that connects sellers to buyers. The platform allowed retailers to resell retail returns and overstock and enabled buyers to access bulk lots of surplus merchandise. In 2001, the company acquired SurplusBid.com, which included a contract with the United States Department of Defense.

The company's Initial public offering (IPO), valuing the business at $76.9M, took place on February 23, 2006, and the company began trading on the NASDAQ stock exchange under the symbol LQDT. Prior to going public, Liquidity Services opened online auctions for European corporations and government agencies to sell their surplus goods on the international market.

Between 2008 and 2011, Liquidity Services acquired four new marketplaces: Network International, GovDeals, TruckCenter.com, and the remarketing business of Jacobs Trading Company. In 2012, it acquired GoIndustry DoveBid, a provider of surplus asset management, auction, and valuation services.

In 2015, the company lost two large contracts. Walmart terminated its deal with Liquidity Services, and the company lost a bidding war for the right to sell the Department of Defense's surplus tanks, trailers, and other vehicles. Liquidity Services holds the DoD's scrap property contract.
 
In September 2016, Liquidity Services launched IronDirect.com, an online marketplace selling large construction equipment.

In July 2018, Liquidity Services acquired Machinio.com, an online platform for used equipment listings.

On March 25, 2020, in response to the COVID-19 pandemic, Liquidity Services announced "business contingency plans" in reaction to "an adverse impact on its financial condition and results of operations."

Services

Liquidity Services’ online marketplaces include: Liquidation.com, Secondipity.com, GovLiquidation.com, GovDeals.com, Network International, GoIndustry DoveBid, and IronDirect. They offer over 500 product categories organized into categories across 12 major industry verticals: government, energy, construction and mining, transportation, industrial manufacturing, biopharmaceuticals, electronics manufacturing, consumer goods and OEMs, automotive manufacturing, retail, fast-moving consumer goods, and aerospace and defense.

References

External links 
 

Companies based in Washington, D.C.
Logistics companies of the United States
Transportation companies based in Washington, D.C.